Ravnik may refer to:

Places
In Croatia:
 Ravnik (island), an Adriatic island

In Romania:
 Rafnic, a village in the commune of Lupac 

In Slovenia:
 Nanos, Vipava, a settlement in the Municipality of Vipava (known as Ravnik until 1955)
 Ravnik, Bloke, a settlement in the Municipality of Bloke
 Ravnik, Šentrupert, a settlement in the Municipality of Šentrupert
 Ravnik pri Hotedršici, a settlement in the Municipality of Logatec

People
Janko Ravnik, Slovenian composer